Sirvano Valdes (born 30 March 1953) is a Cuban wrestler. He competed in the men's Greco-Roman 48 kg at the 1976 Summer Olympics.

References

1953 births
Living people
Cuban male sport wrestlers
Olympic wrestlers of Cuba
Wrestlers at the 1976 Summer Olympics
Place of birth missing (living people)
Pan American Games medalists in wrestling
Pan American Games gold medalists for Cuba
Wrestlers at the 1975 Pan American Games
20th-century Cuban people
21st-century Cuban people